Isla Gatun is a private island located in the middle of the Panama Canal in the southwest of Gatun Lake, which was the largest man-made lake in the world at the time it was built. The island is ringed with trees and foliage but the center is barren. There are no known indigenous humans residing on the island; however, small animals such as monkeys, parrots, toucans and tapirs do inhabit the island. The island is currently for sale for the price of $30,000; however, the island is not titled much like 95% of the Panamanian islands and is only available with a Right of Possession. The village Arenosa also has a small marina, restaurants, and cell phone reception.

References 

Lake islands of Panama
Panama Canal
Private islands of Panama